The Story of Woo Viet is a 1981 Hong Kong political drama directed by Ann Hui and starring Chow Yun-fat as the title character, Woo Viet. The assistant director was Stanley Kwan and the action choreographer was Ching Siu-tung.

The film was one of the first political dramas made in Hong Kong. It used the story of Vietnamese refugees (boat people) to reflect on Hong Kong's handling of the refugee issue, and also on Hong Kong's sentiment regarding their uncertain future of sovereignty at the time. It is also the second part of Ann Hui's Vietnamese trilogy.

The movie features a famous Cantonese song, "This is Love", sung by Teddy Robin, the producer of this movie.

In the United States, the film is marketed under the title God of Killers, capitalizing on Chow's popularity in heroic bloodshed films.

Woo Viet, as he is Vietnamese, should actually have the surname of Hồ (as in the "Ho" in Ho Chi Minh) rather than the Cantonese translation of the Hu / Woo / Ho surname.

Plot
The story features Woo Viet, who wants to leave his country, Vietnam, behind and start over in the United States. But he first must make his way to Hong Kong. In a refugee detention camp there, he discovers many of his countrymen are disappearing under mysterious circumstances. As Woo tries to find out what is happening, he realizes his life is in danger, and has to leave for the United States immediately using a false passport instead of seeking asylum. In the process, he meets a beautiful woman, Cham Thanh, who then travels with him. When Woo and his new love stop over in the Philippines, they discover that the females are conned to stay there to become prostitutes. Instead of taking the plane to the United States, Woo Viet decides to stay in the Philippines to save his love. However, as he is stranded in Manila's Chinatown, Woo Viet is forced to work as a hired killer.

Cast
Chow Yun-fat as Woo Viet
Cora Miao as Leee Lap-quan
Lo Lieh as Sahm
Cherie Chung as Sum Ching
Dave Brodett as Migual
Fanny serrano
Ben Makalalay
Josie "shoemaker" Tagle

External links

 HK cinemagic entry

1981 films
1981 drama films
Hong Kong drama films
Political drama films
1980s Cantonese-language films
Films directed by Ann Hui
Films set in Hong Kong
Films shot in Hong Kong
Films set in the Philippines
1980s Hong Kong films